This River Blackwater drains small parts of the English counties of Hampshire and Wiltshire. It is a tributary of the River Test.

Course
It rises just to the east of the Wiltshire village of Redlynch, east of Salisbury. It then flows east into Hampshire, where it flows north of the village of Wellow and the hamlet of Wigley. The river turns south, passing under the M27 and past Broadlands Lake and the Testwood Lakes reservoirs, before joining the Test between Totton and Redbridge.

Water quality
The Environment Agency measures water quality of the river systems in England. Each is given an overall ecological status, which may be one of five levels: high, good, moderate, poor and bad. There are several components that are used to determine this, including biological status, which looks at the quantity and varieties of invertebrates, angiosperms and fish. Chemical status, which compares the concentrations of various chemicals against known safe concentrations, is rated good or fail.

Water quality of the River Blackwater in 2019:

See also 
This River Blackwater should not be confused with the River Blackwater in north-east Hampshire, which is a tributary of the River Loddon and (indirectly) of the River Thames.

Another similarly named waterway in Hampshire is Black Water, a small stream which flows eastwards across the New Forest, passing under Rhinefield Ornamental Drive, before joining Ober Water and Highland Water just north of Brockenhurst to form the Lymington River.

References 

 Ordnance Survey (2004). OS Explorer Map OL22 - New Forest. .
 Ordnance Survey (2004). OS Explorer Map 131 - Romsey, Andover & Test Valley. .

External links 
 

Rivers of Hampshire
Rivers of Wiltshire
1Blackwater